Clinidium bechyneorum is a species of ground beetle in the subfamily Rhysodinae. It was described by R.T. Bell & J.R. Bell in 1985. It is known from its type locality in Carabobo, northern Venezuela. An additional specimen that might represent a distinct species is from the neighboring Aragua state. The species is named for J. Bechyne and B. Bechyne, collectors of the type series and many other Clinidium specimens.

Clinidium bechyneorum measure  in length.

References

Clinidium
Beetles of South America
Endemic fauna of Venezuela
Beetles described in 1985